Arthur Griez von Ronse (died 17 March 1921) was an Austrian fencer. He competed in the individual épée event at the 1912 Summer Olympics.

References

External links
 

Year of birth missing
1921 deaths
Austrian male épée fencers
Olympic fencers of Austria
Fencers at the 1912 Summer Olympics